Massingberd is a surname. Notable people with the surname include:

Emily Langton Massingberd (1847–1897), English women's rights campaigner and temperance activist
Francis Charles Massingberd (1800–1872), English churchman, writer, chancellor of Lincoln diocese
Hugh Massingberd (1946–2007), English journalist and genealogist
Sir William Massingberd, 3rd Baronet (1677–1723), English political figure

See also
Massingberd baronets, a title in the Baronetage of England
Archibald Montgomery-Massingberd (1871–1947), British field marshal and Chief of the Imperial General Staff